Ernest Gasson can refer to:

 Ernest Gasson (cricketer, born 1887) (1887–1962), New Zealand cricketer
 Ernest Gasson (cricketer, born 1907) (1907–1942), New Zealand cricketer